Bernie Hawthorne Moore (April 30, 1895 – November 6, 1967) was an American college football, basketball, track and field coach and college athletics administrator. He served as the head football coach at Mercer University (1926–1928) and Louisiana State University (LSU) (1935–1947). Moore was also the head basketball coach at Mercer (1926–1928) and the head track and field coach at LSU (1930–1947). He was then SEC commissioner from 1948 to 1966. He was inducted into the College Football Hall of Fame in 1952.

Early life
Moore was the youngest of 14 children, the son of a Baptist minister. He graduated from Carson–Newman College in Jefferson City, Tennessee, where he played football and baseball.

Career

Coach
Moore coached football, baseball, basketball, and track at Winchester and LaGrange high schools, and Allen Military Academy, before receiving the position of line coach for Sewanee.

Mercer
Moore coached the Mercer Bears from 1926 to 1928. Phoney Smith, Mercer's all-time leading scorer, was the first southern player to cross the goal line against the 1927 "dream and wonder" team of Georgia on a 95-yard kickoff return. Later Georgia coach Wally Butts was also one of Moore's players at Mercer.

LSU
Moore came to Louisiana State University in 1929 as an assistant coach for Russ Cohen's LSU Tigers football team. He became the coach of the LSU Tigers track and field team in 1930. His 1933 track team won the national championship.

Moore took over the LSU football head coaching job in 1935 after the resignation of Biff Jones, and was a popular choice among the football players. Moore's 1935 Tigers posted a 9–2 record and the school's first Southeastern Conference championship.

Commissioner
After ending his tenure at LSU, the longest of any coach at the university to that point, Moore became SEC Commissioner in 1948. In 1967, he won the inaugural James J. Corbett Memorial Award given by the National Association of Collegiate Directors of Athletics.

Later life and legacy
Moore was inducted into the Louisiana Sports Hall of Fame in 1963 and the Tennessee Sports Hall of Fame in 1966. LSU's Bernie Moore Track Stadium is named in his honor. He died on November 6, 1967 in Winchester, Tennessee. Frank Rose, former University of Alabama president, said Moore's "energies, his demand for total integrity, and his devotion to clean sports and good academics have left their mark on the campuses of every SEC member. For that, we are grateful."

Head coaching record

Football

References

Bibliography

External links
 
 Bernie Moore at the Louisiana Sports Hall of Fame
 Bernie Moore at the Tennessee Sports Hall of Fame

1895 births
1967 deaths
Carson–Newman Eagles football players
LSU Tigers football coaches
LSU Tigers and Lady Tigers track and field coaches
Mercer Bears athletic directors
Mercer Bears football coaches
Mercer Bears men's basketball coaches
Sewanee Tigers football coaches
Southeastern Conference commissioners
College track and field coaches in the United States
College Football Hall of Fame inductees
American members of the Churches of Christ
Basketball coaches from Tennessee
People from Winchester, Tennessee
People from Jonesborough, Tennessee